Scalesia divisa is a species of flowering plant in the family Asteraceae. It is found only in Ecuador. It is threatened by habitat loss.

References

divisa
Endemic flora of Ecuador
Critically endangered flora of South America
Taxonomy articles created by Polbot